Vasco de Carvalho (9 March 1902 – 31 October 1990) was a Brazilian rower. He competed in the men's eight event at the 1932 Summer Olympics.

References

1902 births
1990 deaths
Brazilian male rowers
Olympic rowers of Brazil
Rowers at the 1932 Summer Olympics
People from Viseu